In mathematics, especially several complex variables, the Behnke–Stein theorem states that a connected, non-compact (open) Riemann surface is a Stein manifold. In other words, it states that there is a nonconstant single-valued holomorphic function (univalent function) on such a Riemann surface. It is a generalization of the Runge approximation theorem and was proved by Heinrich Behnke and Karl Stein in 1948.

Method of proof
The study of Riemann surfaces typically belongs to the field of one-variable complex analysis, but the proof method uses the approximation by the 
polyhedron domain used in the proof of the Behnke–Stein theorem on domains of holomorphy and the Oka–Weil theorem.

References 

Several complex variables
Riemann surfaces